Skirt Mountain is a  mountain lying approximately  northwest of Victoria, British Columbia in Highland Land District.  It is a part of the Gowlland Range (part of the Vancouver Island Ranges), which extends from the Highlands through Langford to Metchosin.  The indigenous name for the traditional mountain area in shared Coast Salish territories is SPAET ("spa - eth"), which means bear in the Salishan language. The mountain is a popular destination for hikers and mountain-bikers, and is also the site of the controversial Bear Mountain, a golf resort and condominium development.

References

External links
 Bivouac.com - the Canadian Mountain Encyclopedia entry for Skirt Mountain
 Hiking information from britishcolumbia.com
 

Mountains of British Columbia under 1000 metres
Vancouver Island Ranges